The 2019 Salt Lake City mayoral election took place on November 5, 2019 to elect the mayor of Salt Lake City, Utah. The election was held concurrently with various other local elections, and is officially nonpartisan.

In what was regarded to be a surprise, first-term incumbent mayor Jackie Biskupski announced on March 16, 2019 that she would not be seeking a second term, citing a “serious and complex family situation".

A primary election was held on August 15 to determine the two candidates that moved on to the November general election. Erin Mendenhall defeated Luz Escamilla in the runoff.

Primary election

Polling

Results

General election

Polling

Results

Notes

Partisan clients

References

2019 Utah elections
2019 United States mayoral elections
2019